Tell Me Lies is a 1968 British drama film directed and produced by Peter Brook. Based on a play by Denis Cannan called US, it stars Mark Jones, Pauline Munro, Eric Allan, and Robert Langdon Lloyd. The film was shot in London in the summer of 1967 and starred actors under contract to the Royal Shakespeare Company. The film is based on the American involvement in the Vietnam War and was highly controversial at the time of its release.

Tell Me Lies premièred on 14 February 1968 in New York, and on 15 February 1968 in London. It was originally intended to be shown at the Cannes Film Festival in 1968, but was not, due to it being declared inappropriate in the political context of the time. At the Venice Film Festival, it received a special mention from the Jury and was awarded the Luis Buñuel prize.

Plot
A young couple, Bob Lloyd and Pauline Munro see a photo in a magazine of a baby mutilated by napalm and it changes their lives. They ask is London aware, is London concerned?

Songs
 Tell Me Lies
 Road Number One
 Make and Break
 Barry Bondhus
 God is Flame
 Escalation
 The Leeches
 Rose of Saigon
 Any Complaints
 Icarus

Cast
The majority of the cast play "guests":
 Mark Jones: Mark
 Pauline Munro: Pauline
 Eric Allan: Guest
 Robert Langdon Lloyd: Bob (as Robert Lloyd)
 Mary Allen
 Ian Hogg: Guest
 Glenda Jackson: Guest
 Joanne Lindsay: Guest
 Hugh Sullivan: Guest
 Kingsley Amis: Guest
 Peggy Ashcroft	
 James Cameron: Guest
 Stokely Carmichael: Guest
 Tom Driberg: Guest
 Paul Scofield	
 Patrick Wymark: Guest

Rest of cast listed alphabetically:
 Jeremy Anthony: Guest
 Hugh Armstrong: Guest
 Noel Collins: Guest
 John Hussey: Guest
 Marjie Lawrence: Guest
 Leon Lissek: Guest
 Ursula Mohan: Guest
 Reginald Paget: Guest
 Jacqueline Porcher: Guest
 Ivor Richards: Guest
 Clifford Rose: Guest
 Hilary Rose: Guest
 Steven Rose: Guest
 William Morgan Sheppard: Guest
 Barry Stanton: Guest
 Michael Williams: Guest
 Ian Wilson	
 Henry Woolf: Guest
 Peregrine Worsthorne: Guest

The restoration, 2010-2012
In 2010, Peter Brook decided to track down his film, of which he had only a very damaged and incomplete 35mm copy. Through the intermediary of French screenwriter Jean-Claude Carrière, he made contact with the two foundations who had restored the complete film works of Pierre Etaix, co-written by Carrière. Archives were searched across Britain and Ireland, with film elements and a missing scene eventually found at the British Film institute. These elements consisted of 15 separate A and B reels, comprising the film's full 118-minute run time.

In December 2011, restoration began directed by Severine Wemaere, Director of the Technicolor Foundation for Cinema Heritage and Giles Duval, Director of the Groupama Gan Foundation. The exact look Peter Brook had created for the film in 1968 was reproduced with absolute accuracy in the 2012 digital version.

See also
 Anti-war films

References

External links
 

1968 films
British drama films
1968 drama films
Films set in London
Films shot in London
Films directed by Peter Brook
1960s British films